The Leshan dialect (Sichuanese Standard Chinese: No2san1hua4) is the Sichuanese dialect of the city of Leshan and is a variety of Minjiang. It preserves old southern (Ba-Shu) features lost in other Sichuanese dialects and is very different from the dialects of most other cities in the province of Sichuan, which are more typically Mandarin.

Phonology
There are a total of 20 initials in the Leshan dialect.

References

Sichuanese